Çavuşlu is a Turkish place name and may refer to the following places in Turkey:

 Çavuşlu, Baskil
 Çavuşlu, Bayramiç
 Çavuşlu, Bismil
 Çavuşlu, Borçka, a village in Borçka district of Artvin Province
 Çavuşlu, Devrekani, a village in Turkey
 Çavuşlu, Giresun, a town in Görele district of Giresun Province
 Çavuşlu, Hopa, a village in Hopa district of Artvin Province
 Çavuşlu, Karataş, a village in Karataş district of Adana Province
 Çavuşlu, Tarsus, a village in Tarsus district of Mersin Province

Turkish toponyms